Based on a True Story is a 2017 internationally co-produced psychological thriller film directed by Roman Polanski, and written by Polanski and Olivier Assayas from the novel of the same name by Delphine de Vigan. It was screened out of competition at the 2017 Cannes Film Festival.

Plot
The film focuses on writer Delphine (Seigner), who achieved her first career success, publishing her debut novel dedicated to her mother. However, she soon starts receiving anonymous letters accusing her of exposing her family to the public. Depressed and struggling with writer's block, Delphine meets and begins a friendship with a mysterious younger woman (Green) who is seductive, intelligent, and intuitive and who understands Delphine better than anyone else.

Cast

 Emmanuelle Seigner as Delphine Dayrieux
 Eva Green as Elle
 Vincent Perez as François
 Dominique Pinon as Raymond
 Camille Chamoux as Oriane
 Brigitte Roüan as The documentalist
 Josée Dayan as Karina
 Noémie Lvovsky as The inspector
 Damien Bonnard as The perchman

Reception
It won the FIPRESCI Prize in 28th Stockholm Film Festival. On review aggregator website Rotten Tomatoes, the film holds an approval rating of 48% based on 29 reviews, and an average rating of 5.41/10. On Metacritic, the film has a weighted average score of 43 out of 100, based on 8 critics, indicating "mixed or average reviews".

References

External links
 
 
 

2017 films
2017 thriller drama films
2017 psychological thriller films
2010s French-language films
French thriller drama films
French psychological thriller films
Polish thriller drama films
Films based on French novels
Films directed by Roman Polanski
Films with screenplays by Olivier Assayas
Films with screenplays by Roman Polanski
Films set in Paris
Films about writers
2010s French films